Om Prakash Verma (20 March 1937 – 8 December 2015) was an Indian administrator. He was the Governor of Punjab (2003–04), Governor of Haryana (briefly during July 2004), Chief Justice of the Kerala High Court and the chairman of the Himachal Pradesh Human Rights Commission. He was born in Garhmukteshwar District, Ghaziabad, Uttar Pradesh.
He was also the Lokayukta of Himachal Pradesh before taking over the Governorship of Punjab.

He read law at the Campus Law Centre of the Faculty of Law, University of Delhi.

References

Governors of Haryana
2015 deaths
Governors of Punjab, India
20th-century Indian judges
1937 births
Ombudsmen in India
Chief Justices of the Kerala High Court
People from Ghaziabad district, India